The 964th Airborne Air Control Squadron (964 AACS) is assigned to the 552d Operations Group, 552d Air Control Wing at Tinker Air Force Base, Oklahoma.  It operates the E-3 Sentry (AWACS) aircraft conducting airborne command and control missions.

Mission
Provide the Combat Air Force with airborne systems and personnel for surveillance, warning and control of strategic, tactical, and special mission forces.

History
The squadron was an operational training unit for 25th Antisubmarine Wing from November 1942–October 1943. It went on to train B-17 Flying Fortress replacement crews from, November 1943–April 1944.

It conducted visual reconnaissance, medical evacuation, and light transport services for ground forces in Burma from 19 December 1944 until 3 May 1945.

The 964th flew long range surveillance missions in the late 1950s. It rotated aircrews to Southeast Asia from c. 4 April 1965 – 17 May 1974. The 964th also flew combat support missions in Southwest Asia from 17 January–6 March 1991.

Lineage
4th Search Attack Squadron
 Constituted as the 362d Bombardment Squadron (Heavy) on 28 January 1942
 Activated on 15 July 1942
 Redesignated 18th Antisubmarine Squadron (Heavy) on 29 November 1942
 Redesignated 4th Sea Search Attack Squadron (Heavy) on 23 October 1943
 Redesignated 4th Search Attack Squadron (Heavy) on 22 November 1943
 Disbanded on 10 April 1944
 Reconstituted on 19 September 1985 and consolidated with the 164th Liaison Squadron (Commando) and the 964th Airborne Warning and Control Squadron  as the 964th Airborne Warning and Control Squadron 

164th Liaison Squadron
 Constituted as the 164th Liaison Squadron (Commando) on 9 August 1944
 Activated on 3 September 1944
 Inactivated on 3 November 1945
 Consolidated with the 4th Search Attack Squadron and the 964th Airborne Warning and Control Squadron  as the 964th Airborne Warning and Control Squadron

964th Airborne Air Control Squadron
 Constituted as the 964th Airborne Early Warning and Control Squadron on 8 December 1954
 Activated on 8 March 1955
 Inactivated on 30 June 1974
 Redesignated 964th Airborne Warning and Control Squadron on 7 February 1977
 Activated on 1 July 1977
 Consolidated with the 4th Search Attack Squadron and the 164th Liaison Squadron

Assignments
 304th Bombardment Group, 15 July 1942
 25th Antisubmarine Wing, 30 December 1942
 Army Air Forces Antisubmarine Command, 24 August 1943 (attached to 1st Sea-Search Attack Unit after 30 September 1943)
 1st Search Attack Group, 23 October 1943 – 10 April 1944
 1st Air Commando Group, 3 September 1944 – 3 November 1945
 8th Air Division, 8 March 1955
 552d Airborne Early Warning and Control Wing, 8 July 1955 – 30 June 1974
 552d Airborne Warning and Control Wing (later, 552d Airborne Warning and Control Division; 552d Airborne Warning and Control Wing, 552d Air Control Wing), 1 July 1977
 552d Operations Group, 29 May 1992–present

Stations

 Salt Lake City Army Air Base, Utah, 15 July 1942
 Geiger Field, Washington, 15 September 1942
 Ephrata Army Air Base, Washington, 1 October 1942
 Langley Field, Virginia, 29 October 1942 – 10 April 1944
 Burnpur Airfield, India, 3 September 1944
 Inbaung Airfield, Burma, 19 December 1944
 Kan Airfield, Burma, 15 January 1945
 Burnpur Airfield, India, 31 January 1945
 Shwebo Airfield, Burma, 20 February 1945

 Ondaw Airfield, Burma, 12 March 1945
 Burnpur Airfield, India, 31 March 1945
 Sinthe Airfield, Burma, 20 April 1945
 Magwe Airfield, Burma, 4 May 1945
 Burnpur Airfield, India, 10 May-6 October 1945
 Camp Kilmer, New Jersey, 1–3 November 1945
 McClellan Air Force Base, California, 8 March 1955 – 30 June 1974
 Tinker Air Force Base, Oklahoma, 1 July 1977–present

Aircraft operated

B-18 Bolo (1942–1943)
A-20 Havoc (1942–1943)
B-24 Liberator (1942–1943)
B-34 Lexington (1942–1943)
B-17 Flying Fortress (1942–1944)

L-5 Sentinel (1944–1945)
C-64 Norseman (1944–1945)
RC-121 (1955–1963)
EC-121 Warning Star (1963–1974)
E-3 Sentry (1977–present)

Operations
World War II
Vietnam War
Operation Desert Shield
 Operation Desert Storm
 Operation Deliberate Force
 Operation Enduring Freedom
 Operation Iraqi Freedom
 Operation Unified Protector
 Operation Inherent Resolve

References

Notes

Bibliography

External links
AFHRA 964th Airborne Air Control Squadron History
552d Operations Group Fact Sheet

Military units and formations in Oklahoma
964